This page lists the albums that reached number-one on the overall Top R&B/Hip-Hop Albums chart, the R&B Albums chart (which was re-created in 2013), and the Rap Albums chart in 2016. The R&B Albums and Rap Albums charts partly serve as distillations of the overall R&B/Hip-Hop Albums chart.

Note that Billboard publishes charts with an issue date approximately 7–10 days in advance.

List of number ones

See also 
2016 in music
List of Billboard 200 number-one albums of 2016
List of number-one R&B/hip-hop songs of 2016 (U.S.)

References 

2016
2016
United States RandB Hip Hop Albums